Sir Arthur Clavell Salter KC (30 October 1859 – 30 November 1928) was a British Conservative Party politician and judge who sat on the Kings Bench Division of the High Court of Justice.

Early life and education 
Born to Dr Henry Hyde Salter, FRS (1823–71) and his wife Henrietta, Salter was educated at Wimborne Grammar School and King's College London, where he studied arts and law. He married Mary Dorothea (d. 1917) in 1894, daughter of Major J. H. Lloyd. Him and Mary had a daughter and a son, 2nd Lieutenant John Henry Clavell Salter, who was killed in action in World War 1 in 1918. After Mary's death, he married Nora Constance, of Lieutenant Colonel Thomas Heathcote Ouchterloney.

Career 
He was called to the Bar in 1885 by the Middle Temple, and joined the western circuit in the following year. He became a King's Counsel in 1904 and was elected as a Member of Parliament for Basingstoke in 1906, where he sat until his appointment as a High Court Judge in 1917, and sat on the Kings Bench Division. He also served as the Recorder of Poole from 1904 to 1917. During his tenure, he sat on a number of high-profile cases such as that of Horatio Bottomley in 1922, an MP. He served on the High Court until his death on 30 November 1928.

References

External links 
 

1859 births
1928 deaths
Conservative Party (UK) MPs for English constituencies
UK MPs 1906–1910
UK MPs 1910
UK MPs 1910–1918
20th-century English judges
Queen's Bench Division judges
British King's Counsel
20th-century King's Counsel
Alumni of King's College London
Members of the Middle Temple
People educated at Queen Elizabeth's Grammar School, Wimborne Minster
Knights Bachelor